TC-1 might refer to:

 Minolta TC-1, a 35 mm camera
 TC-1, the equatorial satellite used in the Double Star mission
 TC-1, Tien Chien 1, a Taiwanese anti-aircraft missile Sky Sword